Promethium(III) oxide is a compound with the formula Pm2O3. It is the most common form of promethium.

Crystal structure 
Promethium oxide exists in three major crystalline forms:

*a, b and c are lattice parameters, Z is the number of formula units per unit cell, density is calculated from X-ray data.

The low-temperature cubic form converts to the monoclinic structure upon heating to 750–800 °C, and this transition can only be reversed by melting the oxide. The transition from the monoclinic to hexagonal form occurs at 1740 °C.

References 

Promethium compounds
Sesquioxides